Differential Equations is a peer-reviewed mathematics journal published by Springer. Founded in 1965, the journal publishes English translations of papers from the journal Differentsial'nye Uravneniya, which publishes in Russian and focuses on work by scholars in states of the former USSR. 
The journal is indexed by Mathematical Reviews and Zentralblatt MATH.
Its 2009 MCQ was 0.12, and its 2009 impact factor was 0.339.

External links

 Homepage of Differentsial'nye Uravneniya (English)

Mathematics journals
Publications established in 1965
English-language journals
Springer Science+Business Media academic journals
Monthly journals